Balla Camara (born 7 July 1988) is a retired Guinean football striker.

References

1988 births
Living people
Guinean footballers
Guinea international footballers
AS Ashanti Golden Boys players
Horoya AC players
Santoba FC players
Association football forwards
Sportspeople from Conakry